Two's Company is an album by trumpeter/bandleader Maynard Ferguson and vocalist Chris Connor featuring tracks recorded in late 1960 and early 1961 which was originally released on the Roulette label.

Reception 

The contemporaneous DownBeat reviewer criticized some of the arrangements and wrote that "Connor runs into a bit of intonation trouble on "The Wind"". AllMusic reviewer Scott Yanow stated "Although Ferguson gets to throw in some high-register blasts now and then, his orchestra is mostly used as a prop behind Connor. The singer does her best (her voice was in prime form around this time) but the flamboyant and often-pompous arrangements (which are uncredited) take away from any real spontaneity or swing. An odd set".

Track listing 
 "I Feel a Song Coming On" (Jimmy McHugh, Dorothy Fields, George Oppenheimer) – 2:03
 "The Wind" (Russ Freeman, Jerry Gladstone) – 4:55
 "New York's My Home" (Gordon Jenkins) – 4:35
 "Guess Who I Saw Today" (Murray Grand, Elisse Boyd) – 3:27
 "When the Sun Comes Out" (Harold Arlen, Ted Koehler) – 3:35
 "Send for Me" (Ollie Jones) – 2:32
 "Where Do You Go?" (Alec Wilder, Arnold Sundgaard) – 3:40
 "Something's Coming" (Leonard Bernstein, Stephen Sondheim) – 6:32
 "Deep Song" (George Cory, Douglass Cross) – 4:05
 "Can't Get Out of This Mood" (Frank Loesser, McHugh) – 2:42
Recorded in New York City on December 15, 1960 (tracks 2, 3 & 5), December 22, 1960 (tracks 4 & 7) and January 30, 1961 (tracks 1, 6 & 8–10)

Personnel 
Chris Connor – vocals
Maynard Ferguson – trumpet, trombone, French horn
Bill Berry, Rolf Ericson, Chet Ferretti – trumpet
Kenny Rupp, Ray Winslow – trombone
Lanny Morgan – alto saxophone, flute
Willie Maiden – tenor saxophone, clarinet
Joe Farrell – tenor saxophone, soprano saxophone, flute
Frank Hittner – baritone saxophone, bass clarinet
Jaki Byard – piano
John Neves – bass
Rufus Jones – drums

References 

1961 albums
Chris Connor albums
Maynard Ferguson albums
Roulette Records albums
Albums produced by Teddy Reig
Collaborative albums